Jackie's Back (stylized as Jackie's Back!) is a 1999 television film directed by Robert Townsend. It premiered on the Lifetime Television Network on June 14, 1999.

Plot
Presented as a mockumentary, Jackie's Back chronicles the life and career of Jackie Washington (Jenifer Lewis), a 1960s/1970s R&B diva. After several years of toiling in obscurity, Washington decides to organize her own comeback concert with filmmaker Edward Whatsett St. John (Tim Curry) filming the event. The film also features numerous cameo appearances by celebrities.

Cast
 Jenifer Lewis as Jackie Washington
 Tim Curry as Edward Whatsett St. John
 T.V. Blake as Antandra Washington (Jackie's daughter)
 Tangie Ambrose as Shaniqua Summers Wells (Jackie's daughter)
 Robert Bailey, Jr. as Wilson Wells (Jackie's grandson)
 Whoopi Goldberg as Nurse Ethyl Washington Rue Owens (Jackie's sister)
 Loretta Devine as Snookie Tate (Jackie's childhood friend)
 Tom Arnold as Marvin Pritz (Jackie's former manager)
 Alan Blumenfeld as Ivan
 Loren Freeman as Kim
 Johnny Brown as Reverend Eustace Barnett
 Julie Hagerty as Pammy Dunbar
 David Hyde Pierce as Perry
 Kathy Najimy as Lola Molina
 Kyla Pratt as Little Jackie Washington
 Rudy Ray Moore as Dolemite
 Isabel Sanford as Miss Krumes
 JoBeth Williams as Jo Face
 Mary Wilson as Vesta Crotchley (Jackie's 3rd grade teacher)
 Richard Lawson as Milkman Summers (Jackie's Ex-Husband #1)
 Reynaldo Rey as Cadillac Johnson (Retired Pimp)

Cameos

 Patti Austin
 Charles Barkley
 Diahann Carroll
 Eddie Cibrian
 Jackie Collins
 Don Cornelius
 Taylor Dayne
 Melissa Etheridge
 Kathy Griffin
 Sean Hayes
 Ricki Lake
 Howie Mandel
 Camryn Manheim
 Penny Marshall
 Bette Midler
 Liza Minnelli
 Rosie O'Donnell
 Dolly Parton
 Donna Pescow
 Chris Rock
 Eva Marie Saint
 Grace Slick
 Robert Townsend
 Bruce Vilanch

External links
 
 
 

1999 television films
1999 films
1999 comedy films
American mockumentary films
Films directed by Robert Townsend
Films scored by Marc Shaiman
Lifetime (TV network) films
1990s English-language films
1990s American films